The Penrose–Hawking singularity theorems (after Roger Penrose and Stephen Hawking) are a set of results in general relativity that attempt to answer the question of when gravitation produces singularities. The Penrose singularity theorem is a theorem in semi-Riemannian geometry and its general relativistic interpretation predicts a gravitational singularity in black hole formation. The Hawking singularity theorem is based on the Penrose theorem and it is interpreted as a gravitational singularity in the Big Bang situation. Penrose was awarded the Nobel Prize in Physics in 2020 "for the discovery that black hole formation is a robust prediction of the general theory of relativity", which he shared with Reinhard Genzel and Andrea Ghez.

Singularity
A singularity in solutions of the Einstein field equations is one of two things:

 a situation where matter is forced to be compressed to a point (a space-like singularity)
 a situation where certain light rays come from a region with infinite curvature (a time-like singularity)

Space-like singularities are a feature of non-rotating uncharged black holes as described by the Schwarzschild metric, while time-like singularities are those that occur in charged or rotating black hole exact solutions. Both of them have the property of geodesic incompleteness, in which either some light-path or some particle-path cannot be extended beyond a certain proper time or affine parameter (affine parameter being the null analog of proper time).

The Penrose theorem guarantees that some sort of geodesic incompleteness occurs inside any black hole whenever matter satisfies reasonable energy conditions. The energy condition required for the black-hole singularity theorem is weak: it says that light rays are always focused together by gravity, never drawn apart, and this holds whenever the energy of matter is non-negative.

Hawking's singularity theorem is for the whole universe, and works backwards in time: it guarantees that the (classical) Big Bang has infinite density. This theorem is more restricted and only holds when matter obeys a stronger energy condition, called the dominant energy condition, in which the energy is larger than the pressure. All ordinary matter, with the exception of a vacuum expectation value of a scalar field, obeys this condition. During inflation, the universe violates the dominant energy condition, and it was initially argued (e.g. by Starobinsky) that inflationary cosmologies could avoid the initial big-bang singularity. However, it has since been shown that inflationary cosmologies are still past-incomplete, and thus require physics other than inflation to describe the past boundary of the inflating region of spacetime.

It is still an open question whether (classical) general relativity predicts time-like singularities in the interior of realistic charged or rotating black holes, or whether these are artefacts of high-symmetry solutions and turn into spacelike singularities when perturbations are added.

Interpretation and significance 
In general relativity, a singularity is a place that objects or light rays can reach in a finite time where the curvature becomes infinite, or spacetime stops being a manifold. Singularities can be found in all the black-hole spacetimes, the Schwarzschild metric, the Reissner–Nordström metric, the Kerr metric and the Kerr–Newman metric, and in all cosmological solutions that do not have a scalar field energy or a cosmological constant.

One cannot predict what might come "out" of a big-bang singularity in our past, or what happens to an observer that falls "in" to a black-hole singularity in the future, so they require a modification of physical law. Before Penrose, it was conceivable that singularities only form in contrived situations. For example, in the collapse of a star to form a black hole, if the star is spinning and thus possesses some angular momentum, maybe the centrifugal force partly counteracts gravity and keeps a singularity from forming. The singularity theorems prove that this cannot happen, and that a singularity will always form once an event horizon forms.

In the collapsing star example, since all matter and energy is a source of gravitational attraction in general relativity, the additional angular momentum only pulls the star together more strongly as it contracts: the part outside the event horizon eventually settles down to a Kerr black hole (see No-hair theorem). The part inside the event horizon necessarily has a singularity somewhere. The proof is somewhat constructiveit shows that the singularity can be found by following light-rays from a surface just inside the horizon. But the proof does not say what type of singularity occurs, spacelike, timelike, orbifold, jump discontinuity in the metric. It only guarantees that if one follows the time-like geodesics into the future, it is impossible for the boundary of the region they form to be generated by the null geodesics from the surface. This means that the boundary must either come from nowhere or the whole future ends at some finite extension.

An interesting "philosophical" feature of general relativity is revealed by the singularity theorems. Because general relativity predicts the inevitable occurrence of singularities, the theory is not complete without a specification for what happens to matter that hits the singularity. One can extend general relativity
to a unified field theory, such as the Einstein–Maxwell–Dirac system, where no such singularities occur.

Elements of the theorems 

In history, there is a deep connection between the curvature of a manifold and its topology. The Bonnet–Myers theorem states that a complete Riemannian manifold that has Ricci curvature everywhere greater than a certain positive constant must be compact. The condition of positive Ricci curvature is most conveniently stated in the following way: for every geodesic there is a nearby initially parallel geodesic that will bend toward it when extended, and the two will intersect at some finite length.

When two nearby parallel geodesics intersect, the extension of either one is no longer the shortest path between the endpoints. The reason is that two parallel geodesic paths necessarily collide after an extension of equal length, and if one path is followed to the intersection then the other, you are connecting the endpoints by a non-geodesic path of equal length. This means that for a geodesic to be a shortest length path, it must never intersect neighboring parallel geodesics.

Starting with a small sphere and sending out parallel geodesics from the boundary, assuming that the manifold has a Ricci curvature bounded below by a positive constant, none of the geodesics are shortest paths after a while, since they all collide with a neighbor. This means that after a certain amount of extension, all potentially new points have been reached. If all points in a connected manifold are at a finite geodesic distance from a small sphere, the manifold must be compact.

Roger Penrose argued analogously in relativity. If null geodesics, the paths of light rays, are followed into the future, points in the future of the region are generated. If a point is on the boundary of the future of the region, it can only be reached by going at the speed of light, no slower, so null geodesics include the entire boundary of the proper future of a region. When the null geodesics intersect, they are no longer on the boundary of the future, they are in the interior of the future. So, if all the null geodesics collide, there is no boundary to the future.

In relativity, the Ricci curvature, which determines the collision properties of geodesics, is determined by the energy tensor, and its projection on light rays is equal to the null-projection of the energy–momentum tensor and is always non-negative. This implies that the volume of a congruence of parallel null geodesics once it starts decreasing, will reach zero in a finite time. Once the volume is zero, there is a collapse in some direction, so every geodesic intersects some neighbor.

Penrose concluded that whenever there is a sphere where all the outgoing (and ingoing) light rays are initially converging, the boundary of the future of that region will end after a finite extension, because all the null geodesics will converge. This is significant, because the outgoing light rays for any sphere inside the horizon of a black hole solution are all converging, so the boundary of the future of this region is either compact or comes from nowhere. The future of the interior either ends after a finite extension, or has a boundary that is eventually generated by new light rays that cannot be traced back to the original sphere.

Nature of a singularity 
The singularity theorems use the notion of geodesic incompleteness as a stand-in for the presence of infinite curvatures. Geodesic incompleteness is the notion that there are geodesics, paths of observers through spacetime, that can only be extended for a finite time as measured by an observer traveling along one. Presumably, at the end of the geodesic the observer has fallen into a singularity or encountered some other pathology at which the laws of general relativity break down.

Assumptions of the theorems 
Typically a singularity theorem has three ingredients:

 An energy condition on the matter,
 A condition on the global structure of spacetime,
 Gravity is strong enough (somewhere) to trap a region.

There are various possibilities for each ingredient, and each leads to different singularity theorems.

Tools employed 
A key tool used in the formulation and proof of the singularity theorems is the Raychaudhuri equation, which describes the divergence  of a congruence (family) of geodesics. The divergence of a congruence is defined
as the derivative of the log of the determinant of the congruence volume. The Raychaudhuri
equation is

The key point is that  will be non-negative provided that the Einstein field equations hold and

 the null energy condition holds and the geodesic congruence is null, or
 the strong energy condition holds and the geodesic congruence is timelike.

When these hold, the divergence becomes infinite at some finite value of the affine parameter. Thus all geodesics leaving a point will eventually reconverge after a finite time, provided the appropriate energy condition holds, a result also known as the focusing theorem.

This is relevant for singularities thanks to the following argument:

 Suppose we have a spacetime that is globally hyperbolic, and two points  and  that can be connected by a timelike or null curve. Call this geodesic .
 The geodesic  can be varied to a longer curve if another geodesic from  intersects  at another point, called a conjugate point.
 From the focusing theorem, we know that all geodesics from  have conjugate points at finite values of the affine parameter. In particular, this is true for the geodesic of maximal length. But this is a contradictionone can therefore conclude that the spacetime is geodesically incomplete.

In general relativity, there are several versions of the Penrose–Hawking singularity theorem. Most versions state, roughly, that if there is a trapped null surface and the energy density is nonnegative, then there exist geodesics of finite length that cannot be extended.

These theorems, strictly speaking, prove that there is at least one non-spacelike geodesic that is only finitely extendible into the past but there are cases in which the conditions of these theorems obtain in such a way that all past-directed spacetime paths terminate at a singularity.

Versions 
There are many versions. Here is the null version:

 Assume
 The null energy condition holds.
 We have a noncompact connected Cauchy surface.
 We have a closed trapped null surface .
 Then, we either have null geodesic incompleteness, or closed timelike curves.
 Sketch of proof: Proof by contradiction. Being a trapped null surface, by the null Raychaudhuri equation, both families of null rays emanating from  will encounter caustics. (A caustic by itself is unproblematic. For instance, the boundary of the future of two spacelike separated points is the union of two future light cones with the interior parts of the intersection removed. Caustics occur where the light cones intersect, but no singularity lies there.) The null geodesics generating  have to terminate, however, i.e. reach their future endpoints at or before the caustics. So, we know caustics will develop for every generator before a uniform bound in the affine parameter has elapsed. As a result,  has to be compact. Either we have closed timelike curves, or we can construct a congruence by timelike curves, and every single one of them has to intersect the noncompact Cauchy surface exactly once. Consider all such timelike curves passing through  and look at their image on the Cauchy surface. Being a continuous map, the image also has to be compact. Being a timelike congruence, the timelike curves can't intersect, and so, the map is injective. If the Cauchy surface were noncompact, then the image has a boundary. We're assuming spacetime comes in one connected piece. But  is compact and boundariless because the boundary of a boundary is empty. A continuous injective map can't create a boundary, giving us our contradiction.

 Loopholes: If closed timelike curves exist, then timelike curves don't have to intersect the partial Cauchy surface. If the Cauchy surface were compact, i.e. space is compact, the null geodesic generators of the boundary can intersect everywhere because they can intersect on the other side of space.

Other versions of the theorem involving the weak or strong energy condition also exist.

Modified gravity
In modified gravity, the Einstein field equations do not hold and so these singularities do not necessarily arise.

Notes

References 

 The classic reference.

. Also available as 
Kalvakota, Vaibhav R. (2021), "A discussion on Geometry and General Relativity" 
See also  for a relevant chapter from The Large Scale Structure of Space Time.
Witten, Edward (2020), "Light Rays, Singularities, and All That", Rev. Mod. Phys. 92, 45004 (2020), https://doi.org/10.1103/RevModPhys.92.045004 . Also available as https://arxiv.org/abs/1901.03928. An excellent pedagogical review of causal properties of General Relativity.

General relativity
Mathematical methods in general relativity
Theorems in general relativity